Haslam's Book Store is a historic new and used independent bookstore in St. Petersburg, Florida. It is located in the Grand Central District and is the largest independent bookstore in Florida with over 30,000 square feet. Haslam's was started in 1933 by John and Mary Haslam. Their son Charles and his wife, Elizabeth, joined them in running the business after World War II.  The store was originally a magazine exchange.  Writer Jack Kerouac was a frequent visitor. There have been many claims of Kerouac's ghost frequenting the store. 

HuffPost put Haslam's as number forty-one on their list of top fifty bookstores in America. 

As per their website they closed 'in the interest of public safety' on March 22, 2020, and have not reopened since.

References

External links

 Official Website

Bookstores of the United States
Companies based in St. Petersburg, Florida
Retail companies established in 1933
American companies established in 1933
1933 establishments in Florida
Independent bookstores of the United States